Daren Tan Xuan Yu (born 22 February 1983) is a Singaporean singer. He was the winner of Project Superstar Season 2. He has been listed among CLEO magazine's 50 Most Eligible Bachelors. He changed his Chinese name to Chén Xuān Yù in 2014, and this was formally announced in Project Superstar 3 live show on national TV on 25 August 2014.

Discography 
Tan's debut album, titled Regardless, was released islandwide on January 26, 2008. One of his songs, "Dou Shen", is the theme song for the popular Mediacorp drama Metamorphosis.

The first song in his debut album, titled "Regardless" (Bu Xu Li You) is actually a remake of Melee's single "Built To Last".

Filmography

Film

Television

Personal life
Tan was educated at Bukit Panjang Pri School, Gan Eng Seng School and Ngee Ann Polytechnic. 

Tan founded Cahoots Social Network, an influencer marketing agency in 2016.

Tan married Dr. Nadia Lum in November 2017, after having met through a mutual friend and got engaged after dating for almost two years. Their first child, a girl was born on 22 December 2018.

Awards 
 Project Superstar Season 2 Male Champion
 Project Superstar Season 2 Overall Champion
 Cleo's Most Eligible Bachelor (2008)

References

External links 
'Daren edges out Diya to take the crown'
Daren Tan's Personal Blog
Daren Tan's Official Facebook Page

Living people
Singaporean people of Chinese descent
1983 births
21st-century Singaporean male singers
Singaporean Mandopop singers
Ngee Ann Polytechnic alumni